A list of films produced by the Israeli film industry in 1948.

1948 releases

See also
1948 in Israel

References

External links
 Israeli films of 1948 at the Internet Movie Database

Israeli
Film
1948